Tasmanotrechus is a genus of beetles in the family Carabidae, containing the following species:

 Tasmanotrechus alticola - Eberhard & Giachino, 2011
 Tasmanotrechus cockerilli - Moore, 1972
 Tasmanotrechus compactus - Moore, 1983
 Tasmanotrechus concolor - Moore, 1972
 Tasmanotrechus elongatus - Moore, 1994
 Tasmanotrechus gordoni - Eberhard & Giachino, 2011
 Tasmanotrechus leai - (Sloane, 1920)
 Tasmanotrechus montisfieldi - Eberhard & Giachino, 2011
 Tasmanotrechus moorei - Eberhard & Giachino, 2011
 Tasmanotrechus osbornianus - Eberhard & Giachino, 2011
 Tasmanotrechus rolani - Eberhard & Giachino, 2011

References

Trechinae